Dark Circles is a 2013 psychological horror film starring Johnathon Schaech and Pell James.

Synopsis
Alex (Johnathon Schaech) and Penny (Pell James) have decided to uproot themselves from their hectic city lives and move out to the country, believing that it will be better for their baby. The move is not without hesitation, as Penny is concerned that she will not be a fit mother for her baby while Alex can't help but wonder if it would have been better to remain in the city with his bandmates. Soon after they move, strange things begin to occur that cause them to wonder if the move was really the best idea.

Cast
 Johnathon Schaech as Alex
 Pell James as Penny
 Philippe Brenninkmeyer as Michael
 Jennifer Foreman as Nancy
 Andrea Frankle as Johanna

Reception
Critical reception has been mixed. Shock Till You Drop gave a mostly favorable review, writing that it was "a fun, creepy movie that depicts problems that every couple faces with new parenthood, just with a little paranormal activity thrown in the mix." DVD Talk and Dread Central both gave mixed reviews, praising the film while also stating that it did have some issues.

References

External links
 

2013 films
2013 horror films
Films about families
Films directed by Paul Soter
2010s English-language films